The Tenth Legislative Assembly of Sikkim constituted after the 2019 Sikkim Legislative Assembly elections. The results being declared on 23 May 2019. The term of the tenth Sikkim Legislative Assembly started on 28 May 2019.

Members of Legislative Assembly
The tenth assembly was elected in 2019 Sikkim Legislative Assembly election. The current members  are listed below:

References

 
 
Sikkim